Allied Blenders & Distillers (commonly referred to as ABD) is the third largest IMFL in India and the largest Indian-owned alcoholic beverage company, with its headquarters in Mumbai, India. They export to 22 countries around the world. It is a major distributor of whiskey, Rum, Vodka, brandy and other Spirits.

History 
Allied Blenders & Distillers was founded by Kishore Rajaram Chhabria in 1988 in Kolkata. Prior to establish ABD Kishore was the managing director of the Shaw Wallace, an Indian liquor manufacturer based in Kolkata. Kishore Chhabria observed that the frontline brands had received all of the attention. He established a separate part of the business in Delhi and produced a new whisky with the goal of reviving underappreciated names.

The first brand of the company brand was Officer's Choice.

In 2010, ABD added Jolly Roger to its offerings creating its own space in the Rum category. In 2011, ABD entered the deluxe whisky segment with the launch of Officer's Choice Blue.

In 2012, the company launched Officer's Choice Blue in Delhi. In 2013, ABD launched Kyron in the premium brandy sector.

In 2014, Allied Blenders & Distillers acquired 50% ownership rights in Dutch liquor major Herman Jansen's Mansion House brandy and Savoy Club whiskey.

In 2015, ABD acquired Shasta Biofuels, a Telangana-based integrated grain spirit distillery for Rs. 200 crore.

In May 2017, Officer's Choice Blue launched in Nepal.

In July 2021, Shekhar Ramamurthy was appointed as the Executive Deputy Chairman of ABD.

In 2022 the company launched its Rum brand Jolly Roger in Rajasthan, Uttar Pradesh.

ABD has filed draft papers to raise Rs. 2000 crore in IPO in June 2022 and in December 2022, SEBI approved the application.

ABD currently has 9 owned bottling units, 1 distilling unit and 22 non owned manufacturing units with sales across 30 States and Union Territories.

Sterling Reserve Cup 
In 2022, Allied Blenders & Distillers presented Sterling Reserve Cup for Indian v/s New Zealand Cricket tournament 2022.

Notable brands 
Allied Blenders & Distillers manufactures brandy, whisky, rum, blended liquors, spirits and vodka.

Whisky
Officer's Choice
Officer's Choice Blue
Officer's Choice Star
Iconique White
Sterling Reserve Blend 7
Sterling Reserve Blend 10
Sterling Reserve B7 Cola Mix
X&O Barrel
Srishti Premium

Brandy
Kyron Premium
Officer's Choice Brandy

Rum
Jolly Roger
Officer's Choice Rum

Vodka
Class21

References 

Distilleries in India
1988 establishments in India
Drink companies of India
Food and drink companies established in 1988